Xacuti or Xacutti is a curry prepared in Goa, India, with complex spicing, including white poppy seeds, sliced or grated coconut and large dried red chilies. It is usually prepared with chicken, lamb, or beef. It is also known as chacuti in Portuguese.

Xacuti or Shagoti as is commonly known in Goa has its origin in Harmal (now Arambol) in Pernem Taluka of Goa. Historically, local fishermen would prepare a sauce or gravy containing spices such as black pepper (meerya), chilli, turmeric, onion, nutmeg, cinnamon, and cloves. Added to this would be lightly toasted coconut and white poppy seeds. This sauce would then be served with freshly caught fish or chicken.

References

Indian curries
Indian meat dishes
Goan cuisine
Poppy seeds